Wedderveer is a hamlet near Wedde in the municipality of Westerwolde in the Netherlands.

The sawmill Spinnenkop has been listed as a national heritage site since 1990.

References

External links 
 

Populated places in Groningen (province)
Westerwolde (municipality)